Riaz Basra  (1967 – 14 May 2002) was, with Akram Lahori a.k.a. Muhammad Ajmal and Malik Ishaq, a founder of the militant organization Lashkar-e-Jhangvi during 1996.

Career
Riaz Basra was born to Ghulam Muhammad and Jalal Bibi in Chak Chah Thandiwala, Sargodha, in 1967.  He studied at madrassas in Lahore and Sargodha before joining the political party Sipah-e-Sahaba in 1985.  Basra allegedly fought in the Afghan War on the mujahideen side, receiving a bullet wound in the leg.

Among his objectives was the establishment of a Sunni Islamic Emirate in Pakistan and the declaration of Shias as non-Muslims. In 1988, he had also tried his luck, unsuccessfully, for an assembly seat from Lahore, Punjab. Contesting against Nawaz Sharif and winning 9000 votes, the same year he was also made the central-secretary (broadcast and publications) of the SSP.

Basra was alleged to be involved in killings of hundreds of Shias, including Shia doctors, policemen, lawyers, in killing Iranian diplomat Sadiq Ganji in 1990 and for killing the Shia leader Syed Sikandar Shah, and a deadly attack on a gathering at a Shia cemetery in 1998, in an assassination attempt on Nawaz Sharif in 1999, besides being accused of several bank heists. He was arrested in 1992 and sentenced to death for killing Ganji, but escaped from prison in 1994. Basra was also alleged to be involved in killing the Imamia Students Organization leader Dr Muhammad Ali Naqvi in 1995, Sargodha commissioner Syed Tajammal Abbas in 1996, and in killing Gujranwala SSP Muhammad Ashraf Marth in 1997. 
 
In 1996, Basra broke from Sipah-e-Sahaba to form his own anti-Shia organization Lashkar-e-Jhangvi.  The organization takes its name from the deceased founder of Sipah-e-Sahaba, Haq Nawaz Jhangvi, who was killed in a bomb attack by an unknown assailants believed to be sponsored by Shia group on 23 February 1990.

On one occasion, Basra is believed to have coerced the Punjab Chief Minister into easing police pressure on his group. He had demonstrated his ability to penetrate the CM's security by having himself photographed with the CM without his knowledge. On another occasion, he had got himself photographed with Nawaz Sharif in a similar fashion, and sent the photo to Sharif's office.

Death
Basra had a bounty of Rs. 5 million on his head and when he was killed, reportedly in a shootout in May 2002, in Kot Choudhary Sher Muhammad Ghalvi, Dokota, a Shia village in Vehari district, Punjab, doubts were expressed about his death because Sargodha police had already claimed to have killed him in 1999 and the Punjab police had also claimed to have killed him on six occasions. Basra and three other Lashkar-e-Jhangvi members had come to stage an attack on Choudhary Fida Hussain Ghalvi, a prominent Shia leader, but were met with armed resistance by local villagers. According to one report, a special police brigade arrived to support a half-hour later, ending the fight, during which all four Lashkar-e-Jhangvi members were killed. Doubts have been expressed about this version of events because Basra was reported to be in police custody at the time of this shootout and hardly anyone believes this account to be true.  However, Pakistan's then Information Minister Nisar Memon denied any foul-play. It is alleged he was killed by Shia fighters seeking to take matters into their own hands after police incompetence.

Basra was buried in his home village of Khurhseed, near Jhawarian outside of Sargodha. His funeral was attended by 20,000 people; though police presence prevented SSP, LeJ of leadership and thousands of people from participating, and Basra's body was wrapped in the LeJ flag.

References

External links
 Information on Riaz Basra, the alleged assassin of Iranian diplomat Sadiq Ghanji who escaped custody of the Pakistan authorities, European Country of Origin Information Network.

1967 births
2002 deaths
People from Sargodha District
Assassinated Pakistani people
Pakistani Islamists
Terrorism in Pakistan
Deobandis
Leaders of Islamic terror groups